Podbiel  is a village in the administrative district of Gmina Celestynów, within Otwock County, Masovian Voivodeship, in east-central Poland.

Near village, on marshes "Bagno Całowanie" was discovered relics of neolithic settlement (11 800 – 8500 years BP).

References

Podbiel